Centre Department was one of the original four departments of Ivory Coast. It was established in 1961, along with Nord Department, Sud-Est Department, and Sud-Ouest Department. During Centre Department's existence, departments were the first-level administrative subdivisions of Ivory Coast.

Using current boundaries as a reference, the territory of Centre Department was composed of Lacs District, Marahoué Region, Vallée du Bandama District, and Yamoussoukro Autonomous District.

In 1969, Centre Department and the other five existing departments of the country were abolished and replaced with 24 new departments. The territory of Centre Department became the new departments of Bouaflé, Bouaké, Dimbokro, and Katiola.

References
"Districts of Côte d'Ivoire (Ivory Coast)", statoids.com, accessed 17 February 2016.

Former departments of Ivory Coast
1961 establishments in Ivory Coast
1969 disestablishments in Ivory Coast
States and territories established in 1961
States and territories disestablished in 1969